The Sandars Readership in Bibliography is an annual lecture series given at Cambridge University. Instituted in 1895 at the behest of Mr Samuel Sandars of Trinity College (1837–1894), who left a £2000 bequest to the University, the series has continued down to the present day. Together with the Panizzi Lectures at the British Library and the Lyell Lectures at Oxford University, it is considered one of the major British bibliographical lecture series.

Lectures 
 1895 Sir Edward Maunde Thompson: Greek, Latin and English handwriting.
 1896 C. H. Middleton-Wake: The invention of printing.
 1897 W. H. Stevenson: Anglo-Saxon Chancery.
 1898 E. Gordon Duff: The printers, stationers and book-binders of Westminster and London in the 15th Century.
 1899 J. W. Clark: The care of books (to the end of the 18th century).
 1900 F. G. Kenyon: The development of Greek writing, BC 300–AD 900.
 1901 H. Y. Thompson: English and French illustrated MSS. of the 13th–15th centuries.
 1902 M. R. James: Manuscripts in Cambridge.
 1903 E. Gordon Duff: The printers, stationers and book-binders of London, 1500–1535.
 1904 H. Y. Thompson: Illustrated MSS. of the 11th century.
 1905 Sir Edward Maunde Thompson: The history of illumination and ornamentation of MSS.
 1906 F. W. Maitland: [Did not lecture.]
 1907–1908 F. J. H. Jenkinson: Books printed at Cologne by U. Zell.
 1909 F. Madan: The localisation and dating of MSS.
 1910 W. M. Lindsay: Latin Abbreviations.
 1911 E. Gordon Duff: English provincial printers, stationers and book-binders to 1557.
 1912 A. E. Cowley: The Papyri of Elephantine.
 1913 W. W. Greg: Some bibliographical and textual problems of the English Miracle-play Cycles.
 1914 E. A. Loew: (1) Characteristics of the so-called National Scripts. (2) Punctuation and critical marks as aids in dating and placing MSS. (3) Graeco-Latin manuscripts. (4) The Codex Bezae and the Codex Laudianus.
 1915 A. W. Pollard: The conditions of printing and publishing in Shakespeare’s day in their relation to his text.
 1916–1920 [Lectures suspended.]
 1921 E. Wyndham Hulme: Statistical bibliography in relation to the growth of modern civilisation.
 1922 W. C. Bolland: Readings on the Year Books.
 1923 M. R. James: The pictorial illustration of the Old Testament from the 14th Century to the 16th.
 1924 Emery Walker: Printing for book production.
 1925 E. H. Minns: The influence of materials and instruments upon writing.
 1926 A. J. K. Esdaile: Elements of the bibliography of English literature, materials and methods.
 1927 G. D. Hobson: English leather bindings down to 1500.
 1928 R. B. McKerrow: The relationship of English printed books to authors’ manuscripts in the 16th and 17th centuries.
 1929 S. De Ricci: English collectors of books and MSS., 1550–1900, and their marks of ownership.
 1930 J. V. Scholderer: The invention of printing: facts and theories.
 1931 Stanley Morison: The English newspaper: some account of the physical development of the journals printed in London from 1622 down to the present day.
 1932 J. Dover Wilson: The Hamlet texts, 1604 and 1623.
 1933 G. L. Keynes: John Evelyn: a study in bibliography.
 1934 E. G. Millar: Some aspects of the comparative study of illuminated MSS.
 1935 Stephen Gaselee: Bibliography and the Classics.
 1936 C. A. Gordon: Manuscript missals; the English uses.
 1937 M. Sadleir: Bibliographical aspects of the Victorian novel.
 1938 C. J. Sisson: The judicious marriage of Mr Hooker and the birth of ‘the Laws of Ecclesiastical Polity’.
 1939 H. R. Creswick: Some recent work on early English printed books.
 1940–1946 [Lectures suspended.]
 1947 J. W. Carter: Taste and technique in book collecting: a study of recent developments in Great Britain and the United States.
 1948 F. Wormald: The Miniatures in the Gospels of St Augustine: Corpus Christi College MS. 286.
 1949 J. B. Oldham: English blind-stamped bindings.
 1950 H. Williams: The text of Gulliver’s Travels.
 1951 H. S. Bennett: English books and readers 1475 to 1557; being a study in the history of the book trade from Caxton to the incorporation of the Stationers’ Company.
 1952 J. C. T. Oates: The history of the collection of incunabula in the University Library.
 1953 E. P. Goldschmidt: The first Cambridge press in its European setting.
 1954 S. C. Roberts: The evolution of Cambridge publishing.
 1955 N. R. Ker: Oxford libraries in the sixteenth century.
 1956 Wilmarth S. Lewis: Horace Walpole’s Library.
 1957 Fredson T. Bowers: Textual criticism and the literary critic.
 1958 H. Graham Pollard: English market for printed books.
 1959 R. W. Hunt: Manuscripts of the Latin classics in England in the Middle Ages.
 1960 C. H. Roberts: The earliest manuscripts of the Church: style and significance.
 1961 A. H. King: Some British collectors of music, 1600–1960.
 1962 F. J. Norton: Printing in Spain 1500–1520.
 1963 J. H. A. Sparrow: The inscription and the book.
 1964 W. T. Stearn: Bibliography in the service of biology.
 1965 J. C. T. Oates: Abraham Whelock (1593–1653): Orientalist, Anglo-Saxonist and University Librarian.
 1966 S. Smith: The Darwin Collection in Cambridge University Library.
 1967 H. M. Nixon: English bookbinding in the Restoration period.
 1968 B. Dickins: Corpus Christi College, the Parker Library.
 1969 A. N. L. Munby: Gothick into art: connoisseurship and medieval miniatures, 1750–1850.
 1970 J. S. L. Gilmour: Some freethinkers and their writings.
 1971 F. J. Stopp: Monsters and hieroglyphs: the broadsheet and emblem book in sixteenth century Germany.
 1972–1973 M. A. Hoskin: Virtues and vices of scientific manuscripts.
 1973–1974 J. S. G. Simmons: Russian printing from the beginnings to 1917: a view from the West.
 1974–1975 A. R. A. Hobson: Some book collectors, booksellers and binders in sixteenth century Italy.
 1975–1976 D. F. Mackenzie: The London book trade in the later seventeenth century.
 1976–1977 J. M. Wells: Two hundred years of American printing, 1776–1976.
 1977–1978 D. F. Foxon: The Stamp Act of 1712.
 1978–1979 J. P. Gaskell: Trinity College Library: the first 150 years.
 1979–1980 J. G. Dreyfus: British book typography 1889-1939.
 1980–1981 W. Kirsop: Books for colonial readers — The nineteenth century Australian experience.
 1981–1982 W. H. Bond: Thomas Hollis of Lincoln’s Inn: collector, designer and patron.
 1982–1983 Ruari McLean: Moxon to Morison: The growth of typography as a profession.
 1983–1984 P. C. G. Isaac: William Bulmer, 1757–1830: ‘fine’ printer.
 1984–1985 J. J. G. Alexander: Artists and the book in Padua, Venice and Rome in the second half of the fifteenth century.
 1986–1987 Professor R. A. Leigh: Unsolved problems in the bibliography of J. J. Rousseau.
 1987–1988 D. M. Owen: The medieval canon law: teaching, literature and transmission.
 1988–1989 F. W. Ratcliffe: A pre-Lutheran German psalter: A case study of a fourteenth-century work.
 1989–1990 R. I. Page: Matthew Parker, Archbishop of Canterbury, and his books.
 1990–1991 D. S. Brewer: The fabulous history of Venus: Studies in the history of mythography from the Middle Ages to the nineteenth century.
 1991–1992 G. G. Watson: Lord Acton and his library.
 1992–1993 Will Carter: Gutenberg’s legacy.
 1993–1994 Bamber Gascoigne: From priceless perfection to cheap charm: stages in the development of colour printing.
 1994–1995 D. J. Bruce: ‘The real Simon Pure’: The life and work of George Cruikshank.
 1995–1986 J. Harley-Mason: The Age of Aquatint: a chapter in the history of English book illustration.
 1995–1996 A. Derolez: Textualis formata.
 1996–1997 G. Thomas Tanselle: Analytical bibliography: an historical introduction.
 1997–1998 G. G. Barber: Bibliography with rococo roses: The 1755 La Fontaine Fables choisies and the arts of the book in eighteenth-century France.
 1998–1999 P. Donlon: In Fairyland: Irish illustrators of children’s books.
 1999–2000 N. J. Barker: Type and type-founding in Britain 1485-1720.
 2000–2001 D. J. McKitterick: Printing versus publishing: Cambridge University Press and Greater Britain 1873–1914.
 2001–2002 C. Fahy: Paper in the sixteenth-century Italian printing industry.
 2002–2003 M. Foot: Description, image and reality: aspects of bookbinding history.
 2003–2004 Christopher de Hamel: Sir Sydney Cockerell.
 2004–2005 Paul Needham: Fifteenth-century printing: the work of the shops.
 2005–2006 James H. Marrow: Word-diagram-picture: the shape of meaning in medieval books.
 2006–2007 Sarah Tyacke: Conversations with maps.
 2007–2008 Peter Kornicki: Having difficulty with Chinese? — The rise of the vernacular book in Japan, Korea and Vietnam.
 2008–2009 Michelle P. Brown: The book and the transformation of Britain, c. 550–1050.
 2009–2010 Gordon Johnson: From printer to publisher: Cambridge University Press transformed, 1950 to 2010.
 2010–2011 James Carley: From private hoard to public repository: archbishops John Whitgift and Richard Bancroft as founders of Lambeth Palace Library.
 2011–2012 Michael Reeve: Printing the Latin Classics — Some episodes.
 2012–2013 Jim Secord: Visions of science: books and readers at the dawn of the Victorian age.
 2013–2014 Nigel Morgan: Samuel Sandars as collector of illuminated manuscripts.
 2014–2015 Richard Beadle: Henry Bradshaw and the foundations of codicology.
 2015–2016 Anthony Grafton: Writing and reading history in Renaissance England: some Cambridge examples.
 2016–2017 Toshiyuki Takamiya: A cabinet of English treasures: Reflections on fifty years of book collecting.
 2017–2018 Peter Wothers: Chemical attractions.
 2018–2019 William Noel: The medieval manuscript and its digital image.
 2019–2020 Isabelle de Conihout: French bookbindings and bibliophily, 16th–18th centuries.
 2020–2021 Orietta Da Rold: Paper past and paper future.

See also
 E. A. Lowe Lectures
 Lyell Lectures
 McKenzie Lectures
 Panizzi Lectures

References

External links
 "List of Sandars Readers and Lecture Subjects". Cambridge University Library. 2019.

History of books
History of literature
Lecture series at the University of Cambridge
Textual criticism
Textual scholarship